Herbert John Walker  (2 June 1919 – 4 January 2008) was a New Zealand politician of the National Party.

Biography
Walker was born in Rangiora in 1919, and was educated at Rangiora High School. In World War II he served in the Pacific as a NCO in the No. 9 Squadron of the RNZAF from 1942 to 1945, and then qualified as an accountant.

He represented the Christchurch electorates of St Albans in Parliament from 1960 to 1969, and then Papanui from 1969 to 1978, when he was defeated by Mike Moore.

In 1961 he was one of ten National MPs to vote with the Opposition and remove capital punishment for murder from the Crimes Bill that the Second National Government had introduced. In 1969–1972 he was a cabinet minister in the Second National Government: Minister for Broadcasting and Tourism, and Postmaster-General in 1972.  In 1973 when the Labour government of Norman Kirk introduced the Domestic Purposes Benefit (DPB) he said that many lone (solo) mothers on the DPB were "bludgers living off the state".

In 1975–1978 he was Minister of Social Welfare in the Third National Government, and threatened to take legal action against (DPB) beneficiaries in de facto relationships. In the  he lost to Mike Moore.

Walker was a President of Victoria League Canterbury. In the 1983 New Year Honours, he was appointed a Companion of the Order of St Michael and St George, for public and community service. He died in Rangiora on 4 January 2008.

References

Obituary in Dominion Post of 10 January 2008 page B7.

|-

|-

1919 births
2008 deaths
New Zealand Companions of the Order of St Michael and St George
Members of the Cabinet of New Zealand
New Zealand military personnel of World War II
New Zealand National Party MPs
Royal New Zealand Air Force personnel
New Zealand MPs for Christchurch electorates
Unsuccessful candidates in the 1978 New Zealand general election
Members of the New Zealand House of Representatives
People from Rangiora
People educated at Rangiora High School
New Zealand justices of the peace